Bergeyella zoohelcum  is a Gram-negative, rod-shaped, aerobic and non-motile bacterium from the genus of Bergeyella which occurs in the upper respiratory tract of dogs and cats Bergeyella zoohelcum can cause respiratory disease in cats. Bergeyella zoohelcum can cause infections after dog bites.

References

External links
Type strain of Bergeyella zoohelcum at BacDive -  the Bacterial Diversity Metadatabase

Flavobacteria
Bacteria described in 1987